The rosters of all participating teams at the men's tournament of the 2009 Rugby World Cup Sevens.

Pool A

Arabian Gulf

Stephen Cooper
Chris Gregory
Joshua Sherrin
Sean Hurley
Jonny MacDonald
Cory Oliver
Marcus Smith
Stuart Gibb
Dan Patching
David Clark
Francois Coetzer
Taif Al Delamie

Italy

Antiono Mannato
Jaco Erasmus
Simone Favaro
Kris Burton
Samuele Pace
Alessandro Onori
Marko Stanojevic
Michele Sepe
Roberto Mariani
Tomas Pucciariello
Steven Bortolussi
Gonzalo Samuele

New Zealand

Coach:  Gordon Tietjens
Paul Grant
Chad Tuoro
Ben Souness
DJ Forbes
Lote Raikabula
Junior Tomasi Cama
Victor Vito
Julian Savea
Nigel Hunt
Tim Nanai-Williams
Viliame Waqaseduadua
Zar Lawrence

Tonga

Viliami Ma'afu
Josateki Veikune
Siosaia Palei
Alaska Taufa
Peasipa Moimoi
Vaea Poteki (c)
Mateo Malupo
Ualosi Kailea
Siaosi Tu'atao
Muli Kaufusi
Ofa Takai
Sione Fonua

Pool B

Fiji

Semisi Naevo
Apolosi Satala
Napolioni Nalaga
Seremaia Burotu
Pio Tuwai
Jone Daunivucu
Vereniki Goneva
Waisale Sukanaveita
Vilimoni Delasau
Orisi Sareki
Peni Rokodiva
Neumi Nanuku

France

Coach:  Thierry Janeczek
Vincent Deniau (c)
Thomas Combezou
Manoël Dall'igna
Simon Bouty
Renaud Dulin
Rida Jahouer
Farid Sid
Laurent Ferreres
Loic Mazieres
Julien Patey
Julien Malzieu
Paul Albaladejo

Georgia

Viktor Kolelishvili
Alexander Todua
Giorgi Chkhaidze
Bidzina Samkharadze
Merab Kvirikashvili
Lasha Khmaladze
George Shkinin (c)
David Chitidze
George Kacharava
Lekso Gugava
Alexander Nizharadze
Jaba Bregvadze

United States

Coach:  Al Caravelli
Todd Clever
James Gillenwater
Paul Emerick
Shalom Suniula
Jone Naqica
Chris Wyles
Nese Malifa
Rikus Pretorius
Kevin Swiryn
Takudzwa Ngwenya
Justin Boyd
Matt Hawkins

Pool C

Canada

Adam Kleeberger
Neil Meechan
Nanyak Dala
Morgan Williams
Phil Mack
D. T. H. van der Merwe
Justin Mensah-Coker
James Pritchard
Jordan Kozina
Bryn Keys
Gordie Sawers
Ciaran Hearn

Japan

Coach:  Wataru Murata
Kenichiro Iwamoto
Yusaku Kuwazuru
Lepuha Latuila
Michael Leitch
Kaoru Matsushita
Shuhei Narita
So Kil-ryong
Takashi Suzuki
Masahiro Tsuiki
Alisi Tupuailei
Hidefumi Yamamoto
Shinichi Yokoyama

Scotland

Coach:  Stephen Gemmell
Scott Forrest
Roddy Grant
Rob Dewey
Colin Shaw
Andrew Easson
Scott Riddell
Andrew Turnbull
Rory Hutton
Colin Gregor
Mike Adamson
Roland Reid
Jim Thompson

South Africa

Coach:  Paul Treu
Mpho Mbiyozo
Robert Ebersohn
Frankie Horne
Vuyo Zangka
Neil Powell
Kyle Brown (c)
Renfred Dazel
Rayno Benjamin
Paul Delport
Lionel Mapoe
Philip Snyman
Gio Aplon

Pool D

Australia

Coach:  Michael O'Connor
Henry Vanderglas
William Brock
Ben Coridas
Damon Murphy
Sonatane Sefanaia
Luke Morahan
Richard Kingi
Jono Jenkins
Afusipa Taumoepeau
Ed Jenkins (c)
Shaun Foley
William Bishop

Ireland

Kyle Tonetti
Eoghan Grace
James Coughlan
Paul Marshall
Kieran Campbell
Felix Jones
Brian Carney
Brian Tuohy
Conan Doyle
Tom Gleeson
Daniel Riordan
Gareth Brown

Portugal

Vasco Uva
Diogo Mateus
Tiago Girão
Pedro Leal (c)
Joao Mirra
David Mateus
Adérito Esteves
Gonçalo Foro
Pedro Cabral
Pedro Silva
António Maria de Aguilar
Frederico Oliveira

Samoa

Coach:  Titimaea Tafua
Ofisa Treviranus
Simaika Mikaele
Apelu Fa'aiuga
Alafoti Fa'osiliva
Afa Aiono
Uale Mai
Lolo Lui
Jerry Meafou
Rupeni Levasa (c)
Etuale Pitone
Alatasi Tupou
Morgan Salesa

Pool E

England

Coach:  Ben Ryan
Isoa Damu
Charlie Simpson-Daniel
Rob Vickerman
Josh Drauniniu
James Rodwell
Tom Varndell
Ollie Phillips
Andy Vilk
Kevin Barrett
Ben Gollings
Tom Biggs
Chris Cracknell

Hong Kong

Mark Wright
Mark Goosen
Nick Hurrell
Anthony Haynes
Rowan Varty
Tom McQueen
Kenzo Pannell
Andrew Chambers
Jeff Wong
John Gbenda-Charles
Alex McQueen
Keith Robertson

Kenya

Humphrey Kayange
Allan Onyango
Victor Oduor
Ben Nyambu
Wilson Opondo
Lavin Asego
Biko Adema
Innocent Simiyu
Collins Injera
Sidney Ashioya
Gibson Weru
Horace Otieno

Tunisia

Haithem Chelly
Aymen Gloulou
Khaled Zegden
Sabri Gmir
Lotfi Ben Msallem
Sabeur Ben Charrada
Abbes Kherfani
Yosri Souguir
Nasredine Hammami
Mohamed Mhadbi
Amor Mezgar
Amor Hamdi

Pool F

Argentina

Coach: Duncan Forrester
Francisco Merello
Dino Cáceres
Gonzalo Camacho
Lucas González Amorosino
Agustín Figuerola
Pablo Gómez Cora
Santiago Gómez Cora
Santiago Piccaluga
Lucio Lopez Fleming
Martín Rodríguez
Horacio San Martín
Martín Bustos Moyano

Uruguay

Ignacio Conti
Juan Campomar
Jerónimo Etcheverry
Nicolas Morales
Francisco Bulanti
Santiago Carracedo
Juan Martín Llovet
Santiago Gibernau
Manuel Martinez
Ignacio Crosa
Alejo Parra
Matias Arocena

Wales

Coach:  Paul John
Rhodri McAtee
Lee Williams (c)
Tom Isaacs
Craig Hill
James Merriman
Tal Selley
Aled Brew
Aled Thomas
Rhys Webb
Richie Pugh
Dafydd Hewitt
Lee Beach

Zimbabwe

Fortunate Chipendu
Jacques Leitao (c)
Grant Mitchell
Gerald Sibanda
Ryan Manyika
Daniel Hondo
Cleopas Makotose
Slater Ndlovu
Gardiner Nechironga
Willis Magasa
Tengai Nemadire
Wensley Mbanje

References

Rugby World Cup Sevens squads
Squads